The  is a DC electric multiple unit (EMU) commuter train type operated by West Japan Railway Company (JR-West) in the Kansai Region of Japan since 1991.

This train bears no relation to the 207 series built by JNR and operated by JR East until 2009.

Background and history 
The 207 series was developed for use on the Katafuku Line (now known as the JR Tozai Line), and also to be the standard commuter train type for JR-West. The type was introduced into service on 30 April 1991, replacing ageing 101 series and 103 series EMUs operating on the Fukuchiyama Line and the Katamachi Line.

The trains were built jointly by Hitachi, JR-West (Goto Factory), Kinki Sharyo, and Kawasaki Heavy Industries.

Livery revision 

With the introduction of the 321 series fleet from 2005, the livery used with the 207 series was modified from its original two-tone blue scheme to a navy-and-orange color scheme, matching the scheme used with the 321 series.

Refurbishment 
On 22 September 2014, JR-West announced that the 207 series fleet would undergo a program of refurbishment, aiming to improve the fleet's safety, efficiency, and accessibility. 0-subseries set Z22, the first set to be refurbished, returned to service on 17 November 2014.

During the refurbishment program, the interior was fitted with wheelchair spaces, enlarged seat partitions, newly introduced intermediate seat partitions to make way for vertical grab bars, and LED lighting. External changes include the use of HID headlights, gangway door-mounted wipers, and lead car-mounted fall-prevention devices. In addition, the fleet was equipped with abnormality detection technology, and much of the existing electrical equipment was overhauled.

Variants 
 207-0 series (manufactured 1991–1994)
 207-500/1500 series (converted from former 207-0 and 207-1000 series trains in 1996)
 207-1000 series (manufactured 1994–1997)
 207-2000 series (manufactured 2002–2003)

Operations
 Tōkaidō Main Line and Sanyō Main Line Local Service (Biwako Line, JR Kyoto Line, JR Kobe Line):   – 
 Fukuchiyama Line (JR Takarazuka Line):  – 
 Kosei Line:  –  – 
 JR Tōzai Line and Katamachi Line (Gakkentoshi Line):  –  – 
 Osaka Higashi Line and Kansai Main Line (Yamatoji Line): Kizu – , Nara –  – 
 Wadamisaki Line:  –  (sometimes substituted for 103 series)

Formations

207-0 series

7-car set (Pre-series set)
The pre-series set is formed as follows.

4-car sets

207-1000, 207-2000 series

4-car sets

3-car sets

Interior

See also
 Amagasaki derailment – 2005 fatal derailment which involved a 207 series train

References

 
 

Electric multiple units of Japan
West Japan Railway Company
Train-related introductions in 1991
Hitachi multiple units
Kawasaki multiple units
Kinki Sharyo multiple units
1500 V DC multiple units of Japan